Asociación Deportiva Guanacasteca is a Costa Rican football team based in Nicoya, Guanacaste. They currently play in the Costa Rican First Division. Their home stadium is Estadio Chorotega.

History

Origins 
The club was founded on 1973 after amateur team Carrillo FC, that won the 1972 third division amateur championship, the team relocated to Nicoya in order to sign local players to be ready for the Second Division promotional round, also renaming the team as Selección de Nicoya, and winning the promotional round.

First Era 
After three years the club wins the 1976 Second Division and the First Division promotion, returning in 1978 to second division; In 1986 returned to First Division lead by Benigno Guido and finishing top 5. By late 90s the team was sold to Italian club Perugia owners for a short time and resold to other Italian businessmen, under this management the team crowned two more Second Division titles (1995 and 2002); By 2004 the team was sold to local businessmen and relocated to Escazú, renaming as Brujas de Escazú Witches, looking for a higher fan support. On 2011 the team was dissolved since team's president and main stock holder Minor Vargas was incarcerated in the United States for 60 years.

Refound 
Months later, the ADG was reestablished after buying Ciudad Colón second division franchise and relocated to Nicoya for the 2005 season; After 17 years, on May 27, 2021, won their fifth Second Division title against Puntarenas FC.

Crest and colors

Kit suppliers and shirt sponsors

Stadium 
The stadium is located in the Chorotega neighborhood of Nicoya, it has a capacity for 4,500 fans comfortably seated, additional has two bleachers and a large space for standing fans. It has a natural grass in good condition. 

Major renovations planned for the 2021 season to meet First Division requirements includes: roof, lighting, new dressing rooms, gym, press room and commercial stands.
In addition, the stadium is shared with the Asociación Deportiva Nicoya, women's soccer team of the Women's First Division.

Current squad 
As of February 8, 2023

Honours

National 
 Costa Rica Second Division
Champions (5): 1975, 1985, 1995, 2002, 2021
 Costa Rica Third Division
Champions (1): 1972

See also 
 Brujas F.C.
 Municipal Liberia

References 

Association football clubs established in 1973
Football clubs in Costa Rica
1973 establishments in Costa Rica